Carrotblanca is a 1995 8-minute Looney Tunes cartoon. It was originally shown in theaters  alongside The Amazing Panda Adventure (in North America) and The Pebble and the Penguin (internationally). It was subsequently released on video packaged with older Looney Tunes cartoons and was included in the special edition DVD, and later HD DVD and Blu-ray, releases of Casablanca, the film to which it is both a parody and an homage. At the time of release, WB did not own the rights to Casablanca (such rights were with Turner Entertainment – they still technically hold the film today, but WB became responsible for distribution a year after the short's release as a result of their parent company's purchase of Turner in 1996). Like the original film, Carrotblanca is set during World War II.

Unlike the previous modern Looney Tunes shorts, this short was not made by the Greg Ford/Terry Lennon team nor Chuck Jones Film Productions. It was produced by the Animaniacs writing team at Warner Bros. Feature Animation. Carrotblanca was the only Looney Tunes short produced by that group of writers and the Feature Animation division.

The short involves nearly all the major Looney Tunes characters in roles from the film, including Bugs Bunny as Rick, Daffy Duck as Sam and Pepé Le Pew as Captain Renault. Some characters use their real names, others the names of the characters in the original film, or parodic versions. Several minor Looney Tunes characters can be seen in the background (such as Pete Puma as a waiter wearing a kaftan and fez, and Giovanni Jones and The Crusher as the maitre d' and doorman; a customer at a table is Gossamer; Sam Sheepdog as General Pandemonian's driver)

Plot 
General Pandemonium (Yosemite Sam as Major Strasser) gets a frantic call from Foghorn Leghorn saying that a secret German document has been stolen, and immediately heads for the Carrotblanca nightclub―the Cafe Au Lait Americain featuring "Eleanor Roosevelt's All girl revue" . At the nightclub, Usmarte (Tweety Bird as Ugarte, depicted like Peter Lorre), the actual thief, convinces Bugs Bunny (as Rick Blaine) to take the document.

Meanwhile, Sylvester Slazlo (as Victor Lazlo) and his wife Kitty Ketty (Penelope Pussycat as Ilsa Lund) arrive at the club. Ketty attracts the unwanted attention of Captain Louis (Pepé Le Pew) but she scratches him and throws him into the wall. Ketty, who is the ex-girlfriend of Bugs, asks Daffy Duck (as Sam) to play her favorite song. General Pandemonium suspects Sylvester may know about the document and binds him in his office. Ketty pleads with Bugs to help Sylvester out of this. Though Bugs is initially reluctant due to the fact that Ketty broke his heart, he goes to the General's office nevertheless and confuses the General himself into jail.

The story climaxes with Sylvester and Ketty escaping on the plane for Toronto, New York City and Cucamonga, as Bugs watches them go... except that they find Louis on the plane working as a steward. Louis asks Ketty, "Coffee, tea, or moi?", causing her to jump out of the plane in fright, seemingly without a parachute, landing right in front of Bugs. They kiss, then the parachute opens, covering them.

The Warner Bros. Family Entertainment logo appears with "That's All Folks!" written on top of it. Tweety pops up and ends off the cartoon saying (in Peter Lorre's voice) "That's All Folks!"

This cartoon contains the Looney Tunes-logo, but the Merrie Melodies-leader can be heard.

Cast 
 Greg Burson as Bugs Bunny, Foghorn Leghorn, Pepé Le Pew and Airport PA Announcer
 Joe Alaskey as Daffy Duck and Sylvester
 Bob Bergen as Tweety and Crusher
 Maurice LaMarche as Yosemite Sam
 Tress MacNeille as Penelope Pussycat

Cameos 
 Porky Pig
 Sam Sheepdog
 Spike and Chester
 Granny
 Pete Puma
 Beaky Buzzard
 Giovanni Jones
 Elmer Fudd
 Rocky and Mugsy
 Foghorn Leghorn
 Gossamer
 Barnyard Dawg
 Miss Prissy

Reception 
Common Sense Media rated it 5 out of 5 stars.

Home media 
It was released on the DVD set "The Essential Bugs Bunny", and it was released on the special edition of Casablanca. It was later released on the Looney Tunes Parodies Collection DVD.

References

External links 

 
 Carrotblanca at the Big Cartoon Database

1995 films
1995 animated films
1995 short films
1990s American animated films
1990s animated short films
1990s parody films
Casablanca (film)
Looney Tunes shorts
American romance films
1995 romantic drama films
American romantic drama films
Bugs Bunny films
Daffy Duck films
Porky Pig films
Pepé Le Pew films
Beaky Buzzard films
Films scored by Richard Stone (composer)
Films set in 1941
American World War II films
Warner Bros. Animation animated short films
1990s Warner Bros. animated short films
Foghorn Leghorn films
Yosemite Sam films
Elmer Fudd films
Tweety films
Sylvester the Cat films
1990s English-language films
Penelope Pussycat films